Jeff Stans (born 20 March 1990) is a Dutch professional footballer who plays as a midfielder. He formerly played for RKC Waalwijk, Excelsior, NAC Breda and Helmond Sport.

Career
On 23 August 2019, Stans joined Helmond Sport.

Honours

Club
RKC Waalwijk:
Eerste Divisie: 2010–11

References

External links
 
 

1990 births
People from Vlaardingen
Living people
Dutch footballers
Association football midfielders
Eredivisie players
Eerste Divisie players
Excelsior Maassluis players
RKC Waalwijk players
Excelsior Rotterdam players
NAC Breda players
Go Ahead Eagles players
Helmond Sport players
Footballers from South Holland